Dreamtime is an original musical by Jean Marc Cerrone and David Niles.  It was created by Niles, based on an original story by Cerrone.  Niles wrote the book for the musical.  The show's message is the power of love and dreams.  Billed as a "New Broadway Musical Experience," the show combined giant screen images in high definition with live actors, music and laser lighting effects.  The hi-tech, quick editing equipment incorporated into the theater allowed the audience members to be videotaped upon their entrance and become part of the show's finale.  Dreamtime ran on Broadway at the Ed Sullivan Theater in 1992.

Production origins
Dreamtime is an adaptation of several of Cerrone's earlier works. Cerrone was invited to perform several outdoor concerts with laser lights, synchronized water fountains and fireworks commemorating national celebrations before audience of hundreds of thousands. The first, in 1978 was a show inside a plexiglass pyramid on the Pavilion for 1200 people. Over the next ten years the concerts developed more of a theme and narrative storyline.

In 1988 at the request of Paris’ Minister of Culture, Jack Lang, Cerrone conceived the mystical rock opera, The Collector. The Collector, featured musicians Mary Hopkins, Steve Overland and rock bands YES, Earth, Wind & Fire, The Art of Noise and The Paris Opera Choir and was performed on the Trocadero in Paris. The show was revised for the 1989 celebration of the Bicentenary of the French Revolution on the edges of the Seine for an audience of over 600,000. This show called Evolution featured musicians Laura Branigan and Steve Overland with a cast of 30 in the ensemble and choir.

In 1991, another version of the show, now called Harmony, was performed before an 800,000 member audience over the port of Tokyo. Harmony was produced to celebrate the launch of a new Japanese television satellite channel in high definition. Broadway director, David Niles and Cerrone had to rework these huge, spectacular outdoor concerts into a show that would fit into a 1200-seat theater – the result was the Broadway musical experience Dreamtime.

Production history

During Dreamtime’s successful Broadway run at The Ed Sullivan Theater, Consolidated Properties, Inc sold the theater and the office space above to CBS to serve as the new home for the Late Show with David Letterman. CBS needed the theater immediately and struck a deal to move Dreamtime out of the theater. The show was given four weeks to vacate the theater and relocate. Due to the cost of moving the Broadway show and the lack of another comparable Broadway theater, the show closed permanently. The sale of the building and quick vacancy earned Brian Ezraty, the prestigious Henry Hart Rice Achievement Award for the Most Ingenious Deal of the Year for 1993. The show ran for 140 performances.

Plot synopsis
Dreamtime is the story of a woman, a man and the power of love and dreams. A narrator introduces the characters in the story. The narrator is a voice and a vision which appears throughout the story in many forms. The character of “The Woman” represents all women. The character of “The Man” represents all men. “The Collector” is an omnipotent character who speaks through “The Witness” and gives the gift of “The Friend”. “The Collector” urges the audience to take a journey. He explains that many people live a lifetime and never realize their dreams. He asks that the audience travel into “Dreamtime” and help “the Women” and “The Man” to find their dream in one evening. “The Collector” warns the chorus and the audience to beware of “The Chief” who only sees life in black and white and wants people to only to dream while they sleep but not to pursue dreams in their daily life.

In the beginning of the show, the loneliness of “The Woman” and the longing of “The Man” are heard through their music. “The Man”  is tempted by a fan and dreams of love. He is given the gift of friendship and with the help of the audience sees the love of “the Women” The audience is videotaped upon entering the theater and are incorporated into the projections during the finale hence, the cast and the audience become One.

Musical numbers/songs in this production
                       
 Prelude: The Players are introduced
 Solitude:  The Woman's Loneliness
 Inquisition: The Chorus reveal their disbelief in Dreams
 Invitation: The Witness explains the power of Dreams
 What Hit You: The Man's Song of material conquest
 The Challenge: The Man and the Woman discover each other
 Never Give Up: The Man and the Woman discover love
 The Temptation: The Chorus pulls The Man back with them
 Steve's Dream: The Man is swayed by the Chorus in dreams
 I'm Not Sleeping: The Woman's Dream
 The Contract: The Chief and the Chorus reveal their real world
 The Power: The Woman attempts to reason with The Chief
 Friendship: The Collector offers a gift- The Friend
 The Calm: The power of Dream
 Building A Temple: The Man and The Woman sing about hope
 The Vision: The people see the power of Dream in themselves
 Harmony: The Man discovers a new world
 Finale: The cast and the audience become One

Opening night production credits

Theatre Owned/Operated By: Captain N.Y. / 1125 Productions
Produced by: David Niles
Produced by: 1125 Productions
Created by: David Niles and Marc Cerrone
Music & Lyrics by: Marc Cerrone
Additional Lyrics by: Bob Mitchell
Additional Music by: Charles Olins
Book by: David Niles
Based on an original story by: Marc Cerrone
Directed by: David Niles
Choreographed by: David Wolfson
Scenic Design by: David Niles
Sound Design by: Therry Rogan, Didier Bader
Hair & make-up Design by: Paulette Elkind
Music Director: Graham Perkins
HDTV Video Production Sequences by: David Niles
Production Assistants: Nathalie Lozeau, Jon McDonald, Frederic Galfo, Michelle Graves
Music Publishing: NAC/EMORE/OLINS
Associate Producer: Kathleen Canton
Production Stage Manager: Christopher I. Dee
Assistant Director: Mami Katoh
Facilities/House Manager: Christopher I. Dee
Technicians: Jim Chubby, H. Belefon
Lighting Programming: Jay Perez
Legal Counsel: Rosenman & Colin, Andrew Schoen, Alexander Hartnett, Jean Ennochi
Insurance: New Northern Insurance
Accounting: BDO Seidman

Opening night cast

Eddie Bracken -                   Chief
Sonia Jones    -                  Woman
Steve Overland  -                 Man
Ivy Seine    -                    Lioness
Telly Bisone  -                   Witness
Bonnie Comley  -              Man's Fan
Stephanie Daniels  -              Friend
Glenn Weiner -                    Friend
Carol Platz  -                    Friend
Martin Pfefferkorn -              Friend
Mami Katoh  -                     Friend
Beth Boltuch  -                   Chorus/Ensemble
Frank Cava  -                     Chorus/Ensemble
Cynthia Clark   -                 Chorus/Ensemble
Mindy Cooper  -                   Chorus/Ensemble
Dan Larrinaga  -                  Chorus/Ensemble
Elizabeth Mozer   -               Chorus/Ensemble
Susan Campochiaro -          Chorus /Ensemble

Understudies/swings
Jeanne Neyman: Ensemble
Patricia O’Callaghan: Ensemble
Heidi Weeks: Ensemble
Diane DeNoble: Ensemble
Kari Nissena: Ensemble

HDTV video cast
Deirdre Coleman, Natcha Perard, Camille Donatacci, Jordi Caballero, David Elder, Suzanne Phillips, Anne-Brigitte Sirois, Tira.

Vintage video
Ira Gallen

Cast recording

 Dream- Cerrone is available on CD at Unidisc Music, Inc
Malligator Music, Inc.

References
 New York Times article
 Real Estate Weekly article 4/20/1994
 Real Estate Weekly article 5/11/1994
 Real Estate Weekly Article 3/24/1993
 Bravo TV Camille Grammer Bio
 Dreamtime on Abouttheartists.com

External links
More info on David Niles
See for more info on Jean Marc Cerrone
Cerrone discography
Dream CD downloadable
Song lyrics
Article at The New York Times

Broadway musicals
1992 musicals